Bringalily is a rural locality in the Toowoomba Region, Queensland, Australia. In the  Bringalily had a population of 83 people.

Geography
The Millmerran–Inglewood Road (State Route 82) passes through the eastern part of the locality from north to south.

Wondul State Forest is in the north-west of the locality. Despite the name, Bringalily State Forest is not in the locality, but in the locality of Canning Creek, immediately to the south.

History
Bringalily State School opened on 13 February 1934 and closed on 23 July 1965.

Bringalily South Provisional School opened on 1 April 1940. In 1950 it became Bringalily South State School. It closed on 3 March 1967.

In the  Bringalily had a population of 83 people.

References 

Toowoomba Region
Localities in Queensland